Fars Gholan (also Romanized as Fārs Gholān; also known as Fārsī Gholām) is a village in Kharaqan-e Sharqi Rural District, Abgarm District, Avaj County, Qazvin Province, Iran. At the 2006 census, its population was 27, in 8 families.

References 

Populated places in Avaj County